"Ma che freddo fa" is a 1969 song composed by Claudio Mattone (music) and Franco Migliacci (lyrics).  The song premiered at the 19th edition of the Sanremo Music Festival with a double performance of Nada and The Rokes, placing at the fifth place. The first verses include a citation of Donovan's "Laléna". Nada's version was a massive success, selling about one million copies, mainly in the Italian and Spanish markets.
 
The song was later covered by numerous artists, including Mina, Giusy Ferreri, Renzo Arbore, Piccola Orchestra Avion Travel, and, with the title "Et pourtant j'ai froid", Dalida.

Track listing

Nada version 
 7" single - TL 19
 "Ma che freddo fa" (Claudio Mattone, Franco Migliacci)
 "Una rondine bianca" (Claudio Mattone)

The Rokes version 
 7" single - AN 4172
 "Ma che freddo fa" (Claudio Mattone, Franco Migliacci)
 "Per te, per me" (Shel Shapiro, Franco Migliacci)

Certifications

References

1969 singles
Italian songs
1969 songs
Number-one singles in Italy
RCA Records singles
Sanremo Music Festival songs
Songs with music by Claudio Mattone
Songs with lyrics by Franco Migliacci